Global Camps Africa (formerly known as World Camps) is a 501(c)(3) non-profit corporation founded in Reston, Virginia, that runs no-cost American-style summer camps (although many operate year-round) to teach the poorest, most vulnerable children about HIV and AIDS prevention, among other life skills. Global Camps Africa implements its programs through its local South African partner organization, Camp Sizanani Life Skills.

History

Since 2004, Camp Sizanani (Sizanani means to "help each other" in Zulu) has held several residential camp sessions per year in the mountains near Magaliesburg, South Africa. The children at Camp Sizanani come from the townships of Johannesburg, the nation's largest city. Since opening, the camp program has reached nearly 10,000 South African youth over 120 residential sessions. Each residential session lasts eight days and each child can only attend once. 
 
Global Camps Africa provides Saturday Youth Clubs in several locations in the Soweto area as a continuing camp program. Hundreds of former (and future) campers attend the biweekly clubs in the children's communities. Youth Club participants are referred to social service organizations for help with challenges they are facing, including abuse, food insecurity and inadequate healthcare. Access to HIV counseling and testing, as well as psychosocial support from social workers, is also available through the Youth Club.

USAID Partnerships

In 2010, the first USAID/PEPFAR association collaboration with Global Camps Africa and Camp Sizanani Life Skills was a five-day training that was done with an internationally recognized expert on youth development in a camp setting, Michael Brandwein. Brandwein was the trainer for 200 youth development workers from all over South Africa. 

Because of the success of the previous training and from requests from the youth development workers to USAID for Brandwein to return, in November 2013 USAID contracted Global Camps Africa and Camp Sizanani Life Skills again to host a four-day-long South Africa Intentional Camp and Youth Leadership Development Training Workshops held at Misty Hills Hotel, outside Johannesburg, in Gauteng, South Africa. This program was created with the goal of training community caregivers, child and youth care workers, and youth facilitators working with its implementing partners around the country. Training for the 168 participants focused on how to effectively work with young people to achieve the program goals within the camp setting. Trainees were drawn from 31 USAID partner organizations working with orphans, vulnerable children, and youth across South Africa. 
 
During January 2014, Global Camps Africa expanded its reach to children from all nine provinces in South Africa through simultaneous camp sessions funded by USAID. Periodically, additional camps and youth clubs have been held outside Cape Town and Durban, and also in Zambia through partnerships with local organizations in those locations.

"Let's Grow Together" Program for Pre-Camp Aged Kids

Asikhulisane Kids Club (Asikhilsane means “let's grow together” in Zulu) was launched in September 2014 as a program for vulnerable children between the ages of 5–11 years old to deliver essential life skills lessons in an age-appropriate environment. Global Camps Africa identified this need when counselors noticed campers brought their younger siblings with them to Youth Clubs. When telling the parents that the program was only for children ages 12–19 years old, mothers from the community approached the Club leaders where they explained that the younger children also needed basic life skills education. In response, the 'intentional camp' model that Global Camps Africa employs for its adolescent participants has been adapted for children not yet old enough to participate in the residential camp program.

Young Women's Empowerment Camps

In 2020, Camp Dream Big was founded to equip, encourage and inspire young women, ages 15–19 years old, from the township communities surrounding Johannesburg who are at risk of HIV or living with HIV to pursue their dreams and aspirations and to make educated, empowered choices. The camp portion of the program is followed by a two-pronged follow-on program that will reinforce the lessons learned at camp, build campers' capacity for incoming generating activities, provide ongoing access to referral services, and continue community building among the camper cohort. The camp experience is followed by an engagement in Virtual Clubs that are available going forward each week, as well as in-person Imbokodo (Young Women's Empowerment) club meetings every other Saturday for ten weeks following camp. Although Camp Dream Big was founded in 2020, the in-person portion of the follow-on program was not running because of COVID-19 restrictions but resumed as soon as it was permitted.

Virtual Youth Clubs

In response to the COVID-19 pandemic in 2020, Global Camps Africa suspended Camp Sizanani and Youth Clubs to protect the campers' and communities' health. But rather than close operations, Global Camps Africa designed and implemented virtual youth clubs. This virtual educational curriculum is delivered through Facebook and WhatsApp groups, incorporating topics into the program, such as health, wellness, life skills and academic tutoring in core school subjects. 
Virtual Youth Clubs sessions on healthy habits directly respond to the COVID-19 crisis by teaching preventive health practices. The clubs comprise videos on the subject areas, infusing them with activities that the kids experienced in camp, like singing, dancing, and games. The videos are then distributed through each club's WhatsApp group.

Founder and leadership

Global Camps Africa Inc. (formerly WorldCamps) was founded by Philip H. Lilienthal, an American lawyer, camp director and recipient of the U.S. Peace Corps' 2013 Sargent Shriver Award for Humanitarian Service. Lilienthal owned and operated Camp Winnebago in Fayette, Maine, for 30 years before founding Global Camps Africa. His belief in camp's power to change kids' lives motivated him to create Camp Sizanani in South Africa, where the transformational power of camp is leveraged to help disadvantaged young people overcome the enormous challenges they face.

Lilienthal served in the Peace Corps from 1965 to 1967, volunteering in Ethiopia. During his volunteer service, he started his first Africa camp. This would one day lead Lilienthal to the idea of Global Camps Africa in South Africa. There, he teamed with HIVSA, a local HIV/AIDS foundation, to establish Camp Sizanani in the Gauteng province, home to South Africa's capital, Pretoria and its largest city, Johannesburg. 
 
When establishing a new Global Camps Africa location, Lilienthal temporarily assumes the role of a camp director for the new camp's fledgling sessions. He then passes the daily operations on to local leadership for the long term. Current leadership alongside Lilienthal within Global Camps Africa includes Emily Crowder as Executive Director and Mpumi Maesela as South Africa Country Director.

References

External links
 Official Website

Non-profit organizations based in the United States